"No Vaya a Ser" is a song by Spanish singer-songwriter Pablo Alborán from his fourth studio album, Prometo (2017). It was written by Alborán and produced by Julio Reyes Copello. The song was released by Warner Music Spain on 8 September 2017.

Charts

Certifications

References

2017 singles
Pablo Alborán songs
Number-one singles in Spain
Songs written by Pablo Alborán
2017 songs
Warner Music Spain singles
Song recordings produced by Julio Reyes Copello